RMST may refer to:

Rectilinear minimum spanning tree, an algorithm in graph theory
RMS Titanic Inc, a former U.S. company
RMST (gene), a long non-coding RNA gene